Sameer Khajuria (born 25 November 1978) is an Indian cricketer. He made his debut for Jammu and Kashmir in the 2001–02 Ranji Trophy on 1 November 2001. He recorded his best bowling figures playing against Jharkhand in 2006 when he took 7/39 to help Jammu and Kashmir to a five-wicket win.

References

External links

Cricketers from Jammu and Kashmir
Jammu and Kashmir cricketers
1978 births
Living people